Polideportivo Vitoria-Gasteiz is a multi-use sports complex located in Nejapa, El Salvador. The sports complex is mainly used for its soccer facility. The soccer field is the home field of Nejapa F.C., a first division soccer team with a capacity of 2,000. 

It is named after the town of Vitoria-Gasteiz.

Football venues in El Salvador
Sports complexes
Event venues with year of establishment missing